Herbert Holt was a professional rugby league footballer who played in the 1920s. He played at club level for the Featherstone Rovers (Heritage № 44).

Club career
Herbert Holt made his début for the Featherstone Rovers on Saturday 15 September 1923.

Note
Herbert Holt is occasionally misnamed J. Holt.

References

External links
Search for "Holt" at rugbyleagueproject.org

English rugby league players
Featherstone Rovers players
Place of birth missing
Place of death missing
Year of birth missing
Year of death missing